The Encounter is a 2011 Christian film. The role of Jesus, in modern dress, appearing at a diner in modern-day America, is played by Bruce Marchiano who played Jesus in The Visual Bible: Matthew. It is the first installment of the franchise The Encounter.

Plot
The Encounter follows 5 strangers living in California: Nick, an atheist, former NFL player, and owner of a chain of burger restaurants; Hank and Catherine, whose marriage is falling apart; Melissa, a Christian on the way to visit her boyfriend (who is an atheist), and Kayla, a hitchhiker escaping her abusive stepfather in Los Angeles. When a detour road is closed off, the 5 are stranded in a diner with its omnipresent owner, who discreetly reveals himself to be Jesus, and attempts to help each of the patrons to face the truth in his or her life, particularly its dark side, to seek repentance and go for reconciliation.

Along with serving them, Jesus helps Hank and Catherine re-establish dialogue as a couple, helps Melissa think of the long-term difficulties she will face in a relationship, and marriage, with her boyfriend who is a non-believer, and helps Kayla find in her heart the strength to forgive her abusive stepfather, despite everything he has done.

Each patron at the diner ends up being either born again or is brought to a life-changing decision except for Nick, whose pride and selfishness block him and cause him to reject all questioning of his lifestyle and purpose, in spite of acknowledging having been deeply loved by his grandmother. Officer Deville (the police officer who first informed the patrons of the road being closed off) returns and tells everyone that the road has been re-opened. Nick happily leaves with Deville, who gloats that he has "taken one" from Jesus, who counters that he has "saved four".

As the other patrons leave the diner, they learn from an officer on the road that the road is closed again, because of a serious car accident. They learn that Nick was involved in the crash, which killed him instantly. He also reveals that he has never heard of a Police Officer named 'Deville'. Then Kayla realizes that Deville is actually the Devil in disguise based on the pronunciation of his surname.

The next day, Hank and Catherine find that the diner has mysteriously vanished because Jesus has managed to accomplish his mission of turning their lives around. In Thailand, Jesus shows up as a waiter, alluding to the 2012 sequel film, The Encounter: Paradise Lost.

Cast

 Bruce Marchiano as Jesus
 Steve "Sting" Borden as Nick
 Jaci Velasquez as Melissa
 Jamie Nieto as Hank
 Danah Davis as Catherine
 Madison Gibney as Kayla
 Kass Connors as Officer Deville
 Marc Davies as Officer Tom
 Connor Greenbaum as Young Nick
 Elizabeth Ince as Sadie
 Alexandra Samia as Young Melissa
 Olivia Samia as Annie
 Tom Saab as himself
 William Waters as Kayla's Drunken Stepfather 
 David A. R. White as Customer in Thailand (non-speaking cameo)

Sequel
In 2012, a sequel named The Encounter: Paradise Lost was produced, with Bruce Marchiano returning to the role of Jesus. It follows six strangers who find themselves trapped by the threat of an oncoming hurricane in a beachside resort with Jesus, who attempts to spiritually redeem all of them.

Cast

 David A. R. White as Special Agent Ric Caperna
 Bruce Marchiano as Jesus
 Gary Daniels as Charlie Doles
 Robert Miano as Bruno Mingarelli
 Ammy Chanicha as Mimi Mingarelli
 Rif Hutton as Chris Ward
 Shelley Robertson as Helen Ward
 Kass Connors as Mr. Deville
 Sahajak Boonthanakit as Joseph Weinholt

TV series
On October 14, 2016, Pure Flix uploaded a trailer for a series based on (and taking its title from) the film, which the eight-episode first season of premiered on October 21, 2016. A second season is set to take place in the near future, although a definite release date has not yet been decided.

References

External links
 

Films about evangelicalism
2011 drama films
2011 films
Films set in California
Films produced by Russell Wolfe
Portrayals of Jesus in film
Demons in film
The Devil in film
Films set in restaurants
Films produced by David A. R. White
Films directed by David A. R. White
2010s English-language films
Films about child abuse
Films about Christianity